Éire Óg Carrickmore is a hurling club from County Tyrone. Their seniors have won the Tyrone Senior Hurling Championship a record 26 times, with the most recent in 2017, and their first in 1972.

Founding
While memories exist of the ancient game of camán, a precursor to the modern game of hurling, having been played locally in the 19th century, it was not until 1968 that hurling was revived in the parish by Kerryman Gerry Ryle. Gerry had come to teach at Dean Brian Maguirc School and upon coming across unused hurleys in the school gym in 1968, hurling came to life in Carrickmore. From that point Gerry bestowed his passion and enthusiasm for the game hurling upon the youth of the Dean who continued their interest after leaving school to the natural progression of forming Carrickmore's hurling club under the umbrella of St Colmcille's in 1970.. However, it was not until 1974 that the club was named Éire Óg and separated from the football club.

Achievements
In 1970, history was made when the Juveniles won the Tyrone Championship, beating Dungannon in the final The club struggled to survive in those early days and only for the determination of people like Oliver Kerr, the club would not have made it. In 1976, the club colours of black and amber, inspired by All Ireland winning champions Kilkenny, were first worn.

The Seniors first won the County Championship and took home the Benburb Cup in 1972, and during the 70s twice again took it back but it was during the 80s that Éire Óg first had its great success with the underage players of the 70s coming of age. They won the County Championship a remarkable 8 times in a row from 1982 to 1989. By 1990 they had appeared in the County final a staggering 13 times in a row. In 1998, the Seniors broke through to the next level and won the Ulster Shield, while in 2001, the Dean won their first Ulster Vocational Schools U16 championship and then the Minors won the Ulster Championship in 2003. Success was had as well in the Armagh League which was won for the first time in 2004, the historic year of the "clean sweep" in which Carrickmore hurlers and footballers won all county titles at all levels, while the U16s won their first Armagh League title in 2006.

Camogie
The woman's game Camogie was established in the parish in 1978, and flourished until 1989. During those years the camogs enjoyed a lot of success and participated at U14, Minor, U21 and Senior while a number of the players also represented Tyrone at county level. However in Camogie's centenary year 2004, Camogie was re-established in Carrickmore under Éire Óg by Bríd Uí Dhonnghaile and they now compete at U10, Post Primary, U14, U16, Minors and seniors.

References

External links
 "Eire Óg Carrickmore", GAA Info, https://web.archive.org/web/20120515012041/http://m.gaainfo.com/club.php?co=tyrone&club=eireogcarrickmore&width=1280&height=1024 Accessed 23 December 2011.

Hurling clubs in County Tyrone